Stadtsparkasse München is one of the oldest banks in Germany founded in 1824.

It is an institution under the public law and the legal basis is the Savings Banks Act, Bavarian Savings Bank Regulations, and Articles of Association issued by the City Council.

Services 
The Stadtsparkasse provides the universal banking business. It is a market leader in the private customer area in relation to main bank connections. Measured by the average balance sheet, it is the largest Bavarian and fifth largest German savings bank.  The Stadtsparkasse cooperates with the LBS Bayerische Landesbauparkasse, DekaBank and Versicherungskammer Bayern, etc.

Charity 
In 2014 it donated about 4.3 million euros for the social and cultural projects via its 6 foundations:
Kundenstiftung "Gemeinsam Gutes tun"
Kinder- und Jugendstiftung der Stadtsparkasse München
Stiftung Soziales München
Kulturstiftung
Stiftung Straßenkunst
Altenhilfestiftung.

References 
Article contains translated text from Stadtsparkasse München on the German Wikipedia retrieved on 7 March 2017.

External links 
Homepage

Banks of Germany
Public finance of Germany
Banks established in 1824
1824 establishments in Europe
Financial services companies based in Munich